David Watson (2 October 1896–1978) was a Scottish footballer who played in the Football League for Portsmouth.

References

1896 births
1978 deaths
Scottish footballers
Association football forwards
English Football League players
Falkirk F.C. players
Bo'ness F.C. players
Sunderland A.F.C. players
Portsmouth F.C. players